Power is a 1973 album by the Spanish group Barrabás. It was the first album to feature new vocalist José Luís Tejada, and drummer José María Moll, who had previously only played with the band in concerts. Tejada had replaced original singer and bassist Iñaki Egaña on vocals, with Miguel Morales moving to bass guitar. Band leader Fernando Arbex took on the role of producer.

"Boogie Rock" / "Mr Money" and "Casanova" / "Children" were released as singles.

Track listing
"Mr Money" (Fernando Arbex) – 5:01
"Boogie Rock" (Arbex) – 6:15
"Keep on Moving" (Enrique Morales) – 3:32
"The Horse" (Miguel Morales) – 3:27
"Casanova" (Arbex) – 5:04
"You Know" (E. Morales, M. Morales, José Luís Tejada) – 3:51
"Children" (Arbex, M. Morales) – 3:40
"Time to Love" (M. Morales, M. González) – 3:42

Personnel
José Luís Tejada – lead vocals (except track 8), harmonica
Enrique "Ricky" Morales – lead and acoustic guitars, backing vocals
Miguel Morales – bass guitar, acoustic guitar, lead (track 8) and backing vocals
Ernesto "Tito" Duarte – saxophone, flute, bass guitar, percussion, backing vocals
Juan Vidal – keyboards
José María Moll – drums, backing vocals
Produced by Fernando Arbex
Recorded at RCA Victor Studios, Madrid

Release information
Spain – RCA Victor LSP 10487
Germany – RCA Victor LSP 10404
USA – RCA SPL1-2000
Disconforme DISC 1992CD (2000 CD)

Chart performance

References

 Entry at Allmusic []
 Album cover / sleeve notes

1973 albums
Barrabás albums